The 1967 DFB-Pokal Final decided the winner of the 1966–67 DFB-Pokal, the 24th season of Germany's knockout football cup competition. It was played on 10 June 1967 at the Neckarstadion in Stuttgart. Bayern Munich won the match 4–0 against Hamburger SV, to claim their 3rd cup title.

Route to the final
The DFB-Pokal began with 34 teams in a single-elimination knockout cup competition. There were a total of five rounds leading up to the final. In the qualification round, all but four teams were given a bye. Teams were drawn against each other, and the winner after 90 minutes would advance. If still tied, 30 minutes of extra time was played. If the score was still level, a replay would take place at the original away team's stadium. If still level after 90 minutes, 30 minutes of extra time was played. If the score was still level, a drawing of lots would decide who would advance to the next round.

Note: In all results below, the score of the finalist is given first (H: home; A: away).

Match

Details

References

External links
 Match report at kicker.de 
 Match report at WorldFootball.net
 Match report at Fussballdaten.de 

Hamburger SV matches
FC Bayern Munich matches
1966–67 in German football cups
1967
Sports competitions in Stuttgart
20th century in Stuttgart
June 1967 sports events in Europe